Coalmine Creek is a stream in the U.S. state of Oregon. It is a tributary to Sugarpine Creek.

Coalmine Creek was named for coal mining activity in the area.

References

Rivers of Oregon
Rivers of Douglas County, Oregon
Rivers of Jackson County, Oregon